Saint-Cyr-sur-Loire (literally Saint-Cyr on Loire) is a commune in the department of Indre-et-Loire in central France.

It is located northwest of Tours on the other side of the Loire. It is the third largest city in the Indre-et-Loire department, behind Tours and Joué-lès-Tours.

Population

Education

The commune has:
Five public and private preschools (écoles maternelles) with a combined total of 500 students: Jean Moulin, Honoré de Balzac-Anatole France, Charles Perrault, Périgourd, and Saint-Joseph (private)
Four public elementary schools with a combined total of about 700 students: République, Roland Engerand, Honoré de Balzac – Anatole France, and Périgourd; and 140 students at the Saint-Joseph private elementary
Two junior high schools (collèges) with a combined total of 700 students: Henri Bergson and Béchéllerie

Two senior high schools/sixth-form colleges in Tours, Lycée Choiseul and Lycée Jacques de Vaucanson, serve students in this commune.

The Lycée Konan de Touraine-France, a private Japanese international school, operated in the commune from 1991 to 2013.

The École Japonaise Compleméntaire en Touraine (トゥレーヌ補習授業校 Tūrēnu Hoshū Jugyō Kō), a part-time Japanese supplementary school, is held in the École Republique in Saint-Cyr-sur-Loire.

International relations

Saint-Cyr-sur-Loire is twinned with:

Personalities
 Anatole France died here.

See also
 Communes of the Indre-et-Loire department

References

External links

 Home page 

Communes of Indre-et-Loire